No Man's Sky is an action-adventure survival game developed and published by Hello Games. It was released worldwide for the PlayStation 4 and Windows in August 2016, for Xbox One in July 2018, for the PlayStation 5 and Xbox Series X and Series S consoles in November 2020, and for Nintendo Switch in October 2022, while ports for macOS and iPadOS are in development. The game is built around five pillars: exploration, survival, combat, trading and base building. Players are free to perform within the entirety of a procedurally generated deterministic open world universe, which includes over 18 quintillion planets. Through the game's procedural generation system, planets have their own ecosystems with unique forms of flora and fauna, and various alien species may engage the player in combat or trade within planetary systems. Players advance in the game by mining for resources to power and improve their equipment, buying and selling resources using credits earned by documenting flora and fauna or trading with the aforementioned lifeforms, building planetary bases and expanding space fleets, or otherwise following the game's overarching plot by seeking out the mystery around the entity known as The Atlas.

Sean Murray, the founder of Hello Games, had wanted to create a game that captured the sense of exploration and optimism of science fiction writings and art of the 1970s and 1980s. The game was developed over three years by a small team at Hello Games with promotional and publishing help from Sony Interactive Entertainment. The game was seen as an ambitious project for a small team by the gaming media, and Murray and Hello Games drew significant attention leading to its release.

No Man's Sky received mixed reviews at its 2016 launch, with some critics praising the technical achievements of the procedurally generated universe, while others considered the gameplay lackluster and repetitive. However, the critical response was marred by the lack of several features that had been reported to be in the game, particularly multiplayer capabilities. The game was further criticised due to Hello Games' lack of communication in the months following the launch, creating a hostile backlash from some of its players. Murray stated later that Hello Games had failed to control hype around the game and the larger-than-expected player count at launch, and since have taken an approach of remaining quiet about updates to the game until they are nearly ready to release. The promotion and marketing for No Man's Sky became a subject of debate and has been cited as an example of what to avoid in video game marketing.

Since the game's initial release, Hello Games has continued to improve and expand No Man's Sky to achieve the vision of the experience they wanted to build. The game has received a plethora of free major content updates that have added several previously missing features, such as multiplayer components, while adding features like surface vehicles, base-building, space fleet management, cross-platform play, and virtual reality support. This has substantially improved No Man's Skys overall reception.

Gameplay 

No Man's Sky is an action-adventure survival game played from a first or third person perspective that allows players to engage in four principal activities: exploration, survival, combat, and trading. The player takes the role of a specimen of alien humanoid planetary explorer, known in-game as the Traveller, in an uncharted universe. They start on a randomized planet near a crashed spacecraft towards the edge of the galaxy, and are equipped with a survival exosuit with a jetpack, and a "multitool" that can be used to scan, mine and collect resources as well as to attack or defend oneself from creatures and hostile forces. The player can collect, repair, and refuel the craft, allowing them to travel about the planet, between other planets and space stations in the local planetary system, engage in space combat with alien factions, or make hyperspace jumps to other star systems. While the game is open ended, the player may follow the guidance of the entity known as The Atlas to head towards the centre of the galaxy.

The defining feature of No Man's Sky is that nearly all parts of the galaxy, including stars, planets, flora and fauna on these planets, and sentient alien encounters, are created through procedural generation using deterministic algorithms and random number generators from a single seed number. This 64-bit value leads to there being over 18 quintillion (1.8×) planets to explore within the game. Very little data is stored on the game's servers, as all elements of the game are created through deterministic calculations when the player is near them, assuring that other players will see the same elements as another player by travelling to the same location in the galaxy. The player may make temporary changes on planets, such as mining resources, but these changes are not tracked once the player leaves that vicinity. Until July 2020, the game used different servers for each platform versions; following a July 2020 patch, cross-platform play was enabled for all supported platforms.

Through exploration, the player is credited with units, the in-game currency, by scanning planets, alien bases, flora and fauna in their travels. If the player is first to discover one of these, they can earn additional units by uploading this information to The Atlas, as well as having their name credited with the discovery to be seen by other players. Players have the opportunity to rename these features at this point within limits set by a content filter. No Man's Sky can be played offline, but interaction with The Atlas requires online connectivity.

The player must assure the survival of the Traveller, as many planets have dangerous atmospheres such as extreme temperatures, toxic gases, and dangerous storms. Though the player can seek shelter at alien bases or caves, these environments will wear away at the exosuit's shielding and armour and can kill the Traveller, thus the player must collect resources necessary for survival. By collecting blueprints, the player can use resources to craft upgrades to their exosuit, multitool, and spacecraft to make survival easier, with several of these upgrades working in synergistic manners to improve the survivability and capabilities of the Traveller. Each of these elements have a limited number of slots for both upgrades and resource space, requiring the player to manage their inventories and feature sets, though the player can either gain new slots for the exosuit or purchase new ships and multitools with more slots. Many features of the exosuit, multitool, and spacecraft need to be refuelled after prolonged use, using collected resources as a fuel source.

While on a planet, the Traveller may be attacked by hostile creatures. They also may be attacked by Sentinels, a self-replicating robot force that patrols the planets and takes action against those that take the planet's resources. The player can fend these off using the weapons installed on the multitool. The game uses a "wanted level". Low wanted levels may cause small drones to appear which may be easily fought off, while walking machines, such as the Walker or Quad can assault the player at higher wanted levels. While in space, the Traveller may be attacked by pirates seeking their ship's cargo, or by alien factions with whom they have a poor reputation. Here, the player can use the ship's weapon systems to engage in these battles. Should the Traveller die on a planet, they will be respawned at their last save point without their exosuit's inventory; the player can recover these materials if the player can reach the last death location. If the Traveller dies in space, they will similarly respawn at the local system's space station, but having lost all the goods aboard their ship. Again, these goods can be recovered by travelling to the point at which the player died in space, but with the added uncertainty of pirates claiming the goods first.

Most star systems have a space station where the Traveller can trade resources, multitools, and ships, and interact with one or more aliens from three different races that populate the galaxy, as well as other travellers. Trading posts planets offer similar functions. Each alien race has their own language, with word-for-word substitutions which initially will be nonsense to the player. By frequent communications with that race, as well as finding monoliths scattered on planets that help in translating, the player can better understand these languages and perform proper actions when interacting with the alien non-player characters, gaining favour from the alien and its race for future trading and combat. Consequentially, improper responses to aliens may cause them to dislike the Traveller, and their space-bound fleets may attack the Traveller on sight. The game includes a free market galactic store accessible at space stations and trading posts, where some resources and goods have higher values in some systems compared to others, enabling the player to profit on resource gathering and subsequent trade.

The game has deep crafting capabilities, allowing players to craft technology upgrades, components for more complex items, tradable resources, base construction parts, food and ammo. Crafting requires blueprints, which are unlocked by digging up data modules and trading them in at spacestations. Resources are stored in inventories in the players exosuit, ship, freighter, exocraft, nutrient processor, and storage containers. Resources can be processed into other resources using refiners or nutrient processors, allowing all kinds of food to be created.

No Man's Sky is primarily designed as a single-player game, though discoveries can be shared to all players via the Steam Workshop, and friends can track each other on the game's galactic map. Hello Games' Sean Murray stated that one might spend about forty hours of game-time to reach the centre of the galaxy if they did not perform any side activities, but he also said that he fully anticipated that players would play the game in a manner that suits them, such as having those that might try to catalogue the flora and fauna in the universe, while others may attempt to set up trade routes between planets. Players can track friends on the galactic map and the system maps. Due to limited multiplayer aspects at launch, Sony did not require PlayStation 4 users to have a PlayStation Plus subscription to play the game online.

Initial post-release updates 
A large update released in November 2016, known as the "Foundation Update", added the ability for the player to define a planet as a "home planet", and construct a base on that planet from modular components created from collected resources. Once constructed, the player can then immediately return to their base via teleportation from a space station in the rest of the galaxy. The base supports building special stations, such as research terminals, that can be operated by one of the sentient aliens, which can help to unlock additional base components and blueprints, tend to harvesting flora for resources, and other aspects. The player may opt to tear down the base and relocate to a different home planet at any time. The player can also deploy devices such as automatic mineral drills in the field. The player is able to purchase large starship freighters, which serve both as a space-bound base, with similar base-building and construction options as the planetary base, and as additional storage capacity that collected resources can be transferred.

The Foundation update adds two play modes, with the original gameplay considered as the third, default mode. Survival mode is similar to standard gameplay but the difficulty is much higher—atmospheric effects have larger impact on the exosuit's armour, alien creatures are more hostile, Sentinels are more alert and deadly, and resources tend to be sparse. If a player should die in Survival mode, they must restart without being able to recover their lost progress, though they still possess their credits, alien language progress, and known blueprints. Creative mode removes much of the mechanics that can kill the player's character, and gives them unlimited resources for constructing bases.

A second update released in March 2017, known as the "Path Finder Update", added several new features to the game. Among these included the ability to share bases with other players, as well as new vehicles called exocraft to help in exploration. The exocraft can be built on the player's set home planet, and called upon on any other planet. The update also contained a permadeath option that wipes the player's progress completely on death; support for Steam Workshop for user modifications on the Windows version; new base building features and materials, ship and multitool classes and support for PlayStation 4 Pro enhanced graphics.

A third update, titled "Atlas Rises", was released in August 2017. It includes significant contributions to the game's story mode, added an estimated 30 hours of narrative, and added procedurally generated missions. The player can use portals to quickly transport across the game's galaxy. A limited online cooperative mode, called "Joint Exploration", allows for up to 16 players to explore the same planet and use voice chat and text commands to communicate to others in close proximity, seeing each other as glowing spheres, but otherwise they cannot directly interact with each other; Hello Games called it an "important first step into the world of synchronous co-op". The update was preceded by several weeks of a "Waking Titan" alternate reality game.

Next, Beyond, and further updates
The fourth major update, No Man's Sky Next, was released for PlayStation 4 and Windows on 24 July 2018; this coincided with No Man's Sky release on Xbox One which included all updates including Next. Additionally, the Next update included support for Tencent's WeGame distribution platform in China, which Hello Games says hosts a significant number of No Man's Sky players.

No Man's Sky Next was a significant update that Hello Games considered to be more representative of the game they wanted to release in 2016. The update included a full multiplayer experience, allowing up to four players to create and customize their in-game avatar and to join as allies to explore planets and star systems and build bases together, or as opponents to fight against each other. Bases are no longer limited to specific spots on a planet and now can be built nearly anywhere, including underwater, and such bases are visible to all other players of the game (on their respective platform). Players are able to assemble fleets of starships (called "frigates") to be used to send out on various missions.

The game's engine received a significant overhaul in how planets were procedurally generated as well as how they were rendered to the player. With the expanded multiplayer features, Next required players on consoles to have a PlayStation Plus or Xbox Live Gold service subscription to use the multiplayer elements. At launch, the GOG.com version of No Man's Sky Next lacked the multiplayer component, with GOG offering refunds within a limited window for anyone that had bought the game regardless of when that purchase was made.

Following Next, Hello Games stated their plans to be more interactive with the community and provide more frequent updates, including weekly content with special events with community-driven goals that would provide all players with in-game currency to purchase in-game items, but otherwise free to all players and without microtransactions. The first such event was launched in late August 2018. Additionally, Hello Games launched the Galactic Atlas, a website that players can upload information about interesting discoveries they found in-game for other players to explore themselves.

Subsequent content updates to the game continued after the release of Next. "The Abyss", added in October 2018, greatly expanded the game's features in aquatic biomes, with more creatures, resources, base-building features, additional story content, and a new personal submarine vehicle to help explore underwater areas. The next major update "Visions", released in November 2018, expanded the number of biomes available, incorporated more abnormal flora and fauna on certain worlds, and included the opportunity to collect resources and trophies from the crash sites of freighters, alien bases, and fossilized creatures. An April 2019 update to the Windows version provided a complete overhaul of the graphics API replacing OpenGL with Vulkan. This brought performance improvements, particularly players with AMD GPUs. The update includes improved loading times, HDR support and more graphic settings.

Another major update, "Beyond", was released on 14 August 2019. "Beyond" features three major components. One component, called "Online", expands upon the game's multiplayer features, which Murray compared to the multiplayer features of Destiny. The game now features a larger number of players on the same server, with up to 32 players on personal computers. If players are in the same general area, they will see other players nearby, while alternatively, players are able to travel to the Nexus, where they can meet other players directly and group up, shop, upgrade equipment, and take on missions. A second component is virtual reality support for Windows-compatible headsets (Oculus Rift, HTC Vive, and Valve Index) as well as PlayStation VR on the PlayStation 4 version. Multiple different control schemes are available to players depending on what activity they are in to use with compatible VR controllers. The third part of the update features a number of general improvements across the breadth of the game to add more features. Bases have more customization features, featuring electrical grids and programmable elements, in addition to industrial automation features as to create small automated factories. The programmable options allow players to create custom interactions with the game; Hello Games developers had used the new system to create a version of Rocket League within No Man's Sky, for example. Players can domesticate alien creatures, raising them as livestock and use them as mounts in the game. This added a recipe system that can use various resources to create beneficial items.

Another update after Beyond, called "Synthesis", released in November 2019, adding changes to the game's inventory system, the ability to upgrade one's starship without having to purchase a new one, and around 300 quality of life improvements and bug fixes. The "Living Ship" update in February 2020 introduced sentient organic ships called Void, along with additional story content related to their origins; further, with the "Living Ship" update, Hello Games stated they will still plan these major updates but may introduce feature sets of these in the weeks ahead during regular patches and content updates, as players had seen ahead of the "Living Ship" update. An "Exo Mech" update in April 2020 added mechanized suits that can withstand environmental hazards on planets and aid in quick traversal and mining of resources.

A June 2020 patch added cross-platform play support between all platform, computer, and storefront versions, with other additional features. "Desolation", released in July 2020, introduced abandoned starships with interiors, generated procedurally, containing alien-infested rooms that players can fight through to find resources.

"Origins" is a major update released in September 2020 that effectively doubled the variation in flora and fauna and added new planetary features like binary and ternary star systems, volcanoes, and localized weather patterns and effects. Murray described the "Origins" update as a means to freshen up the game for long-time players as, while previous patches had added numerous new features, they had not really addressed the issues around lack of variety in planetary aspects, which "Origins" set out to address.

"Next Generation" is an update released in November 2020, adding support for the next generation of consoles, the PlayStation 5 (including PlayStation VR) and Xbox Series X and Series S. The update improved the game's visuals on those platforms as well as on the Windows platform to make planets appear fuller, as well as allowing for more extensive base-building sizes. This update also assured that the new console versions were save-game-compatible with the previous ones in the family and supported cross-platform play among all platform versions. "Companions", added in February 2021, allowed players to tame certain alien creatures as domesticated companions on their travels.

The "Expeditions" update in March 2021 added a new Expedition play mode, featuring seasonal challenges that start players at a curated point in the game's universe with pre-allocated equipment, and challenge them to complete various milestones over the course of the season, to earn unique customization options. For example, one such reward during the second seasonal expedition was the ability to unlock a version of the Normandy, the spacecraft from the Mass Effect series from BioWare, coinciding with the release of Mass Effect Legendary Edition.

The VR version of No Man's Sky was one of the first titles to support NVidia's Deep learning super sampling (DLSS) technology for VR games with a patch in May 2021. The June 2021 "Prisms" update improved several of the visual effects across the game and introduced support for NVidia DLSS on compatible graphics cards for the personal computer version of the game.

Following an announcement of the update on the game's fifth anniversary, "Frontiers" was released in September 2021. This added procedurally generated alien settlements, as well as the ability for players to manage and expand a single settlement. The update improved base building further, adding hundreds of new base parts and an overhaul of the base building UI; it also enhanced visual effects for different animations. The fourth Expedition "Emergence", released in October 2021 just ahead of both Halloween and the release of the theatrical Dune adaptation, included a number of updates related to the game's giant worms. The "Sentinel" update released in February 2022 improved the game's combat systems, giving the player more weapon capabilities while expanding the difficulty of the planetary defense systems. With the release of "Sentinel", Murray said that Hello Games considers No Man's Sky nowhere near finished, as "the team are always coming up with new things that they want to do with the game: new content and features and areas for improvement." "Outlaws", released in April 2022, improved starship combat and allowed the player to take on the role of a rogue pilot. A seventh expedition named "Leviathan", released in May 2022, introduced "space whale" organic frigates, which can be recruited into a player's frigate fleet. The "Endurance" update in July 2022 improved base-building features including most customization of one's freighters.

A port for the Nintendo Switch was released 7 October 2022. The Switch version had been at work at Hello Games for a few years, according to the studio, and had several technical challenges they overcame but were able to make the version work on the lower-power hardware. The Switch version includes all updates through "Endurance". However, the game will not initially support multiplayer features, though Hello Games plans to add this in sometime after launch. In addition to the Switch release, the game was updated with the "Waypoint" release across all platforms, which improves core gameplay elements for new players while expanding goals for experienced ones, and brings a new "relaxed" game play mode that still presents potential player character death but at a far lower risk compared to the standard game loop

Hello Games announced development of a PlayStation VR2-optimized port of the game in June 2022. This version was released as the "Fractal Update", coinciding with the VR2's release on 22 February 2023, and included many visual updates for VR users and more options and activities for all players.

Apple announced that they have worked with Hello Games to bring the title to macOS and iPadOS, which will utilize the Metal framework with the MetalFX enhanced that Apple unveiled at the 2022 WWDC.

Plot

Artemis Path 

The Traveller (the player character) wakes up on a remote planet with amnesia, and must locate their crashed starship. After finding their starship, its computer guides the Traveller to make the necessary repairs, and to collect the resources needed to fuel a hyperspace jump to another planetary system. En route, the Traveller encounters individual members of three alien species, the Gek, the Korvax and the Vy'keen, that inhabit the galaxy. During their voyage, the Traveller is compelled by an unknown force to reach the centre of the galaxy.

Along the way to the centre, the Traveller is alerted to a presence of a space anomaly in a nearby system. Travelling there, they find a special space station ("space anomaly") where many strange aliens reside. Two of the aliens, Priest Entity Nada and Specialist Polo, have knowledge beyond what other aliens in the galaxy appear to possess, including being able to speak to the Traveller without translation. They tell of a strange being, found at the centre of the galaxy. They are able to guide the Traveller towards meeting it, by directing them to a nearby black hole that can quickly take the Traveller closer to the centre of the galaxy.

As the Traveller continues on their journey, they receive a message from an alien entity named Artemis. Artemis says that they are also a Traveller and wished to meet others of their kind, but got trapped on a sunless world after stepping through a strange, ancient portal. After triangulating Artemis's position and talking with the local alien species, the Traveller discovers that Artemis's location does not exist. After telling Artemis the news, the transmission ends mysteriously and the Traveller learns of yet another Traveller named Apollo.

The Traveller then contacts Apollo, telling them about Artemis's predicament. The Traveller is told to uncover the connection between the portals and the Sentinels, the robotic beings protecting each planet. After a skirmish with the Sentinels, the Traveller passes through a portal and is taken aboard a large, unknown vessel in space, where they come face to face with the cosmic being Nada spoke about, named the Atlas. The Traveller is then sent to an unknown planet where they find the grave of Artemis, revealing Artemis has been dead the entire time. While trying to contact Apollo, the Traveller accidentally contacts a new entity named -null-, who tells the Traveller that Artemis can be saved using a "Mind Arc". After constructing the Mind Arc, the Traveller must choose whether to upload Artemis's soul into a machine aboard the Anomaly or to let them die. Regardless of the choice, the Traveller is directed by a distress beacon to another portal where they learn that the Atlas is dying.

The Traveller becomes aware that they, like Nada and Polo, are different from the other sentient beings in the galaxy, having some sense of the universe's construction and nature. It is revealed that the galaxy itself exists as a computer simulation managed by the Atlas, and the Travellers, or the fourth race, are entities that were created by the Atlas to explore the simulation. It is also revealed how Nada and Polo met, and how they are "errors" that had become self-aware of being in a simulation and isolated themselves in the anomaly to help others.

The Traveller investigates more Interfaces and finds themselves once again in direct communication with the Atlas. The Atlas informs the Traveller that it does not want to die. In order to save itself, it directs the Traveller to continue to explore and collect information all while moving towards the centre, where the entity appears to be. The Atlas judges the Traveller's progress, and grants them the blueprint for a different Atlas Seed if it deems the Traveller worthy. The Traveller must continue on this journey, receiving help from Nada, Polo and Atlas Seeds from other Interfaces.

Ultimately, the Traveller reaches the galaxy's centre, finding yet another Atlas Interface. The Traveller must choose to either restart the simulation, saving The Atlas, or reject the offer.

If the Traveller chooses to reject The Atlas's offer, the main storyline ends and the Traveller is allowed to explore the galaxy as they wish. Otherwise, if the Traveller chooses to restart the simulation, The Atlas resets, upon which it creates a new galaxy, as well as creating a new Traveller entity to restart the exploration. It is then revealed that this has happened many times before, each time shortening the life of The Atlas. The Atlas tries to observe the future, past its death, but sees nothing, besides the hand of its creator on its glass casing. The Traveller is teleported to the new galaxy, effectively restarting the game.

Development 

No Man's Sky represented Hello Games' vision of a broad, attention-getting game that they wanted to pursue while they secured their financial well-being through the Joe Danger series of games. The game's original prototype was worked on by Hello Games' Sean Murray, who wanted to create a game about the spirit of exploration inspired by the optimistic science fiction of Isaac Asimov, Arthur C. Clarke, and Robert Heinlein, and the cover artwork of these works in the 1970s and 1980s. Murray wanted to re-create the feelings of space exploration seen in older procedurally generated games, including the galaxies of Star Control II, Elite and Freespace. Development expanded into a small four-person team prior to its first teaser in December 2013. About a dozen developers worked on the game in the three years leading up to its release, with Sony Interactive Entertainment providing promotional and marketing support. Sony formally announced the title during their press conference at the Electronic Entertainment Expo 2014, the first independently developed game to be presented at the Expo's centrepiece events.

The game's engine employs several deterministic algorithms such as parameterised mathematical equations that can mimic a wide range of geometry and structure found in nature. Art elements created by human artists are used and altered as well. The game's audio, including ambient sounds and its underlying soundtrack, also uses procedural generation methods from base samples created by audio designer Paul Weir and the British musical group 65daysofstatic.

Release

Promotion and marketing 
No Man's Sky was revealed at the VGX Awards in December 2013, and subsequently gained significant attention from the gaming press. Hello Games sought help from a publisher and got the interest of Sony Interactive Entertainment (then Sony Computer Entertainment). Sony offered to provide development funding but Hello Games only requested financial assistance for promotion and publication. Sony presented the game at their media event during Electronic Entertainment Expo 2014 (E3); until that point, no independently developed game has been demonstrated during these centre-stage events.

Rumors circulated in the lead-up to the 2015 Paris Games Week in October 2015 that No Man's Sky would be released alongside Sony's press conference, but Murray and Sony denied these rumours. Instead, Sony used their press conference to announce the game's expected release in June 2016 for the PlayStation 4.

The game's scheduled release during the week of 21 June 2016 was announced in March 2016, along with the onset of pre-orders for both PlayStation 4 and Windows versions. Hello Games also announced that the PlayStation 4 version would also be available in both a standard and "Limited Edition" retail release, published by Sony, alongside the digital version. About a month before this planned release, Sony and Hello Games announced that the game would be delayed until August 2016, with Murray opting to use the few extra weeks as "some key moments needed extra polish to bring them up to our standards". Hello Games opted not to present at the Electronic Entertainment Expo 2016 in June 2016 so as to devote more time to polishing the game, with Murray noting that due to the structure of the game, "we get one shot to make this game and we can't mess it up." The game had gone gold on 7 July 2016, and was released on 9 August 2016.

The release date in the United Kingdom, originally slated for 12 August and two days after the rest of Europe, was later pushed up to 10 August due in part to a new deal Sony arranged with retailers to allow for simultaneous release in both regions. Two weeks before release, the worldwide Windows version release was pushed out a few days, to 12 August 2016. Murray stated through Twitter that they felt the best experience for players would be a simultaneous worldwide release on the Windows platform, something they could not control with the retail aspects that were associated with the regional PlayStation 4 market, and thus opted to hold back the Windows release to make this possible. They used the few extra days to finish additional technical features that they wanted to include at the Windows launch, such as multiple monitor widescreen support.

The limited edition retail version includes an art book and a comic written by Dave Gibbons, James Swallow and Angus McKie; Sony previously expressed interest in companion fiction for the game's release, and Murray had engaged with Gibbons on developing such a work. Swallow helped with some of the in-game narrative. A limited-run "Explorer's Edition" for the Windows version, published by iam8bit, included a miniature replica of one of the game's spacecraft alongside other materials. Sony released a limited edition bundle with No Man's Sky and a custom face plate for the PlayStation 4 in Europe.

The New Yorker featured No Man's Sky in their 2015 The New Yorker Festival as part of their inaugural Tech@Fest event, highlighting topics on the intersection of culture and technology. On 2 October 2015, Murray made an appearance and gave a demonstration of the game on The Late Show with Stephen Colbert, an American television late-night talk show.

In the weeks leading up to the game's release, Sony released a set of four videos, each focused on the principal activities of the game: exploring, fighting, trading, and surviving. Sony Interactive Entertainment Europe also released a television advertisement for the game featuring comedian Bill Bailey.

Intellectual property issues 
Hello Games had been in legal negotiations with Sky Group (formerly Sky plc) over the trademark on the word "Sky" used for No Man's Sky, a trademark Sky had previously defended against Microsoft's choice of "Skydrive". The issue was ultimately settled in June 2016, allowing Hello Games to continue to use the name.

A few weeks before the game's launch, No Man's Sky was claimed to be using the superformula based on work done by Dr. Johan Gielis in 2003 and subsequently patented by Gielis under the Dutch company Genicap which Gielis founded and serves as Chief Research Officer. Murray had mentioned the superformula while describing the procedural generation aspects of the game in an interview with The New Yorker during development. Genicap anticipates developing a software tool using the superformula for their own product that they can see being used in video game development, which Hello Games would be infringing on if they had used the superformula in the game. The company states they have attempted to reach out to Hello Games to ask them about its use for No Man's Sky but have not received anything back. Genicap said they did not want to stop the launch of No Man's Sky, considered the game to be "very impressive", and that they would like to talk more with Hello Games to exchange knowledge with them, but "if the formula is used we'll need to have a talk". Murray replied that No Man's Sky does not use the superformula, and was working to arrange a meeting with Genicap to discuss the situation and their respective mathematics.

Leaked copies and pre-release review delays 
Two weeks before release, a Reddit user was able to purchase a leaked copy of the game for the PlayStation 4 from eBay for roughly $1,250, and started posting various videos of their experiences in the game. Other users claimed to have leaked copies, and began sharing their own gameplay videos. Some of these reports included negative elements about the game, including frequent crashes and a much-shorter time to "complete" the game by reaching the centre of the virtual galaxy than Hello Games had claimed, leading many fans to express concern and frustration that the game might not be as good as they anticipated. In response, Murray asked people waiting for the game to avoid these spoilers, stating "We've spent years filling No Man's Sky with surprises. You've spent years waiting. Please don't spoil it for yourself."

Some retailers broke the street date, as several players, including journalists at Kotaku and Polygon, streamed their starting playthroughs of the game starting from 5 August 2016. Polygon noted that Sony had not issued any review embargoes for the game at this point. Hello Games reset the servers for the game just prior to 9 August 2016 so as to give all players a clean slate. Prior to release, Sony requested sites to take down videos from early copies, citing that due to the nature of the game, they considered that Hello Games' vision of the game would only be met once a day-one patch was made available at release. Some of these video takedowns had accidentally included users discussing the game but without using these pre-release footage videos, a situation that Murray and Sony worked to resolve.

The day-one patch, which Hello Games had been at work at since the game went gold in July, altered several aspects of how the procedurally generated universe was created, such that existing saves from previous copies would no longer work. This patch removed an exploit that was observed by pre-release players that allowed them to complete the game much faster than anticipated. Commentators noted that the patch would substantially change the aspects of the game previously critiqued by aforementioned early players, and believed some of the changes were made specifically to address these concerns.

Concern was raised by the fan community when OpenCritic, a review aggregator platform, stated that there were going to be no review copies of the game prior to the public release and a review embargo that would end on the date of release. The lack of review copies is a general sign within the industry that there are concerns by the developers or publishers that a game may not live up to expectations and thus indicates that they want to minimise any impact reviews may have prior to release. However, both OpenCritic and Sony later affirmed there would be pre-release review copies and that they were waiting on a pre-release patch before sending these out to journalists. Eurogamer noted that they had expected to have review copies by 5 August, but these were pushed until 8 August so as to get the day-one patch in place, a situation they attributed to the certification process required by Sony for any games on their service. Because of the late arrival of the review copies, and the size of the game, critics presented their reviews "in progress" over several days, omitting a final review score until they had completed enough of the game to their satisfaction.

At launch, a number of software bugs affected both the PlayStation 4 and Windows versions. A game-breaking bug occurred with an in-game pre-order bonus spaceship players could collect that would potentially strand them on a planet, and a resource duplication exploit could significantly reduce the time needed to reach the game's endings. The Windows version garnered several reports of poor graphics rendering, framerates, and the inability to even start the game. Within a day, Hello Games had identified several of the common issues and issued patches while working to provide better technical support and resolve other issues. Murray stated that their initial patches for both systems would be "focused on customer support" before moving onto adding in new features.

Future 
Murray offered the potential to extend the game through downloadable content that, because of the procedural generation systems used, would likely be in the form of added features rather than new content. Hello Games pointed to base building and the ability to purchase freighters as planned additions to the game. Murray anticipated that all updates would be freely available. Former Sony executive Shahid Ahmad, who led Sony's efforts to get No Man's Sky, stated that Hello Games had a planned schedule of updates for the game as early as 2013.

The game's first major content patch, called the "Foundation Update", was released in November 2016 and added the ability for planet-side base-building, interstellar freighter purchases with similar base-building customisation, as well as an open Creative mode. It includes a Survival mode, which reduces the availability of resources and makes encounters with hostiles more difficult, and makes various other improvements.

Murray did suggest the possibility of releasing modding tools for Windows players to alter the game, though noted that they would be limited, and would not allow players to create new planets in the game, for example. About a week after the Windows release players had already started to examine the game's files and create unofficial mods, with at least one mod-sharing website offering these for distribution. Hello Games have since provided patches that help to support these user mods.

Murray stated in an interview with IGN prior to release that virtual reality "would be a really good fit" for No Man's Sky, as the immersive experience could create "really intense moments within a game"; virtual reality support was subsequently announced as part of the free "Beyond" update in mid-2019. Murray also commented on the potential for a remastering of No Man's Sky for a system with more hardware capabilities, suggesting that they would be able to both increase the texture resolution and the degree of complexity of the flora and fauna on the planets.

Reception 

The first introduction of No Man's Sky at the 2013 VGX awards was considered to be the best aspect of the awards presentation. Its expanded coverage at E3 2014 was also met with similar praise, with several critics considering it to have "stolen the show". The title won the show's "Best Original Game" and "Best Independent Game" by a panel of game critics, as well as receiving the "Special Commendation for Innovation" title.

Upon release, No Man's Sky received "mixed or average" reviews, according to review aggregator Metacritic, with the later release on Xbox One receiving "generally favorable reviews". While many praised the technical achievement of No Man's Sky procedurally generated universe, several found that the nature of the game can become repetitive and monotonous, with the survival gameplay elements being lacklustre and tedious. As summarised by Jake Swearingen in New York, "You can procedurally generate 18.6 quintillion unique planets, but you can't procedurally generate 18.6 quintillion unique things to do."

Some of the game's criticism stemmed from the limitations of what procedural generation can bring to a game. While the engine can produce a vast array of different planets, it is built atop a finite number of predetermined assets, such as basic creature shapes or planetary biomes, and one quickly exhausts these core assets even with the variations allowed by procedural generation. An evaluation of the game's code showed that Hello Games had the foresight to enable new predetermined assets to be added into the game through updates, which Gamasutra Alissa McAloon suggested that with more artists to provide more content, Hello Games or third-parties could exponentially expand the perceived uniqueness of each planet. Kate Compton, who worked on the procedural generation elements of Spore, called this issue "procedural oatmeal", in that while it is possible to pour a near infinite number of bowls of oatmeal with various differences, the result still will look like a bowl of oatmeal. Compton noted that No Man's Sky lacks a quality of perceptual uniqueness, a problem that other game researchers are looking to try to solve to provide a more crafted but still procedurally generated experience to the player, placing less emphasis on the vastness of potential outcomes as No Man's Sky marketing relied on.

Polygon Ben Kuchera hypothesised that No Man's Sky could follow the same route as Destiny, a 2014 game that, at release, received lukewarm reviews as it lacked much of the potential that its developers and publishers had claimed in marketing, but became highly praised after several major updates. Kuchera referred to Hello Games' statements regarding new features, downloadable content, and tracking what players are interested in as evidence that No Man's Sky would evolve over time.

Reviewing the Switch version of the game, Shaun Musgrave of TouchArcade indicated that it would be one of the best games of the year for Nintendo's console. Reilly from Nintendo Life was surprised at how successful the game was in porting to the Switch, although there was some sacrifice in visual quality, and rated it excellent. Just pointed out as a negative factor the absence of multiplayer mode, something that is expected in future updates.

Music 
The game's soundtrack, No Man's Sky: Music for an Infinite Universe by 65daysofstatic, was released on 5 August 2016, and received positive reviews from music critics. Andrew Webster of The Verge described the soundtrack as an extension of past 65daysofstatic albums, particularly from Wild Light, but with a greater science-fiction vibe to it, considering the track "Asimov" to be like "taking flight into a Chris Foss painting". Sam Walker-Smart for Clash rated the album 8 out of 10, considered the album one of 65daysofstatic's best, and that it was "apocalyptic, transcendental and drenched in a sense of pure epic-ness".

Sales 
Within a day of the game's launch, Hello Games reported that more than 10 million distinct species were registered by players, exceeding the estimated 8.7 million species identified to date on Earth. On the first day of the Windows release, No Man's Sky saw more than 212,000 concurrent players on Steam, exceeding the largest number of concurrent players for most other games, including other 2016 releases such as XCOM 2 and Dark Souls III. Chart-Track reported that sales of the physical release of No Man's Sky in the United Kingdom during the first week was the second-largest PlayStation 4 launch title published by Sony, following Uncharted 4, and the fifth highest across all publishers and Sony formats. However, a week later, these numbers had dropped significantly; the concurrent player count on Steam fell under 23,000, and United Kingdom sales fell by 81% in the second week. The number of concurrent players on Steam fell to around 2,100 by the end of September 2016. While player dropoff after release is common in games, the dropoff rate for No Man's Sky was considered unusually high. Steam Spy reported that No Man's Sky had the third-highest "hype factor", a statistical measure of concurrent player dropoff from publicly available reports, of all games released on Steam from the start of 2016 to August of that year.

The game was the top downloaded title from the PlayStation Store in the month of August 2016. Physical sales of No Man's Sky across both PlayStation 4 and Windows in August 2016 made it the second-highest selling game in North America by revenue that month, according to NPD Group. SuperData Research stated that for the month of August 2016, No Man's Sky was the second highest-grossing game in digital sales across all consoles, and sixth-highest for PC. Steam developer Valve reported that No Man's Sky was one of the top twelve highest-grossing revenue games available on the platform during 2016, while Steam Spy estimated that more than 823,000 copies were sold in 2016 for a total gross revenue of more than $43 million. At the 2019 Game Developers Conference, Murray stated that sales figures for No Man's Sky Next were comparable to what would satisfy a large AAA publisher at launch. After the game was added to the Xbox Game Pass service in June 2020, Hello Games reported a month later that No Man's Sky had seen more than one million new players.

Awards 
No Man's Sky won the Innovation Award and was nominated for the Best Technology Award for the 2017 Game Developers Choice Awards. Murray and other members of Hello Games had attended the Game Developers Conference, but had not expected to win anything given the game's reputation by that point, and opted to go elsewhere for dinner when they were named the winners of the Innovation Award. The game was nominated for the Excellence in Technical Achievement for the 2017 SXSW Gaming Awards. The title was also named for the British Game award for the 13th British Academy Games Awards. PC Gamer named No Man's Sky its Best Ongoing Game award in 2017, and Shacknews considered it the Best Comeback in 2017, both praising the updates added in the year since its launch that had improved how one interacted with the game. The game was nominated for "Best Co-operative Game" and "Xbox Game of the Year" with No Man's Sky Next at the 2018 Golden Joystick Awards, and for "Best Ongoing Game" at The Game Awards 2018 and again in 2020 and won the award for "Most Evolved Game" at the 2019 SXSW Gaming Awards. At the Italian Video Game Awards, it was nominated for "Best Evolving Game". Beyond VR was nominated for "Best Game Expansion" and "Best VR/AR Game" at the 2019 Golden Joystick Awards, for the latter category at The Game Awards 2019, and for "Evolving Game" at the 16th British Academy Games Awards, won the award for "XR Game of the Year" at the 2020 SXSW Gaming Awards, and won "Best Ongoing Game" at The Game Awards 2020. At the 18th British Academy Games Awards Games Awards, it won "Evolving Game" award. It was subsequently nominated for Evolving Game at the 19th British Academy Games Awards.

Player community
Due to the open-ended nature of the game, players have worked in-game and through online communities to create an in-game system of planets with bases and other features called the Galactic Hub as early as 2016, working to overcome the initial lack of multiplayer features in the game. The players in the Hub have worked to catalog planets and their features within its local area, thus allowing players to use this information to plan resource gathering and trade routes, and once multiplayer features were added, creating interconnected colonies using the game's base-building tools. The Hub has its own form of governance called the Galactic Council to guide how the Hub should expand, particularly after major game patches that render changes to planets, as well as an in-game cryptocurrency called Hubcoin, which is operated by the experimental testnet of Ethereum and has no true monetary value but can be traded in for in-game resources, and intended to be used to pay players for custom bases and other such features.

Backlash over marketing 
Since its reveal at the 2013 VGX show and over the course of its development, the potential of No Man's Sky had been widely promoted across the video game industry and created a great deal of hype. Matt Kamen of Wired UK called No Man's Sky "perhaps one of, if not the, most hyped indie titles in the history of gaming". Much of the attention has been drawn to the massive scope realised by the procedural generation of the game, and the relatively small size of the Hello Games' team behind it. No Man's Sky was seen as a potential industry-changing title, challenging the status quo of triple-A game development, which, according to Peckham, had become "rich and complacent". The game had been considered to have similar potential to affect the game industry as Minecraft, though in contrast, The Atlantic David Sims opined that Minecraft relevance took several years to develop, while No Man's Sky was burdened with expectations from the start. No Man's Sky has been considered by Nathan Lawrence of IGN as a mainstream-friendly space flight simulator game, providing controls that were "simple to learn and fascinating to plumb" compared to Elite: Dangerous and Star Citizen while still offering engaging gameplay.

During development 
The concepts behind No Man's Sky, allowing for a "grail-like feedback loop" around the exploration of near-infinite space according to Time Matt Peckham, created a great amount of anticipation for the game from gamers, as such lofty goals were often seen as a dare for them to challenge. In a specific example, Hello Games had first claimed their system would achieve 4.3 billion planets (232) through the use of a 32-bit key; when players expressed doubt that this scope could be done, Hello Games altered their approach to use a 64-bit number as to create 18 quintillion planets to prove otherwise. Many commentators compared No Man's Sky to 2008's Spore by Maxis, which had promised similar ambitions to use procedural generation to construct new creatures and worlds. However, by Spores release, the extent of the use of procedural generation was scaled back during the course of production, and the resulting game was not as well-received as anticipated. Murray was aware that some critics were applying caution to their view of No Man's Sky due to their previous experiences with Spore.

Kris Graft for Gamasutra commented that many players and journalists had both high expectations for the game as well as wide expectations, with some believing that it would be, among other aspects, the "best space sim", the "best multiplayer action shooter", and the "best pure exploration game". Ars Technica Kyle Orland found that unlike with the developers of Spore or Fable, games promoted with "saturation PR campaigns that promised revolutionary and industry-changing gameplay features" which failed to appear in final releases, Hello Games's statements about No Man's Sky were "relatively restrained and realistic about what they were promising". Orland surmises that many players and journalists "layer[ed] their own expectations onto the game's gaps" from what Hello Games actually claimed. Vlambeer's founder Rami Ismail considered the strength of the marketing campaign by Hello Games and Sony to generate interest in the game, calling the pitch using the concept of magnitudes and scale rather than absolutes as "a little masterclass in explaining an abstract concept to the largest possible audience"; Polygon Ben Kuchera agreed on this point, but considered that the marketing may have gotten away from Sony and Hello Games since players did not have a concrete understanding of the game's limitations prior to launch. Murray himself was aware of the "unrealistic, intangible level of excitement" that fans had of the game and given that they had been waiting three years to play it, would be expecting it to be perfect. He countered that he felt he and Hello Games tried to be "reasonably open and honest about what the game is" all throughout the marketing cycle to set expectations. On the day before the official release, Murray cautioned players that No Man's Sky may not have been "the game you imagined from those trailers" and instead that the title was meant as a "very very chill game", giving players a universe-sized sandbox that makes you feel as if you "stepped into a sci-fi book cover"; Murray believed the game would have a "super divisive" response from players due to some of these expectations.

No Man's Sky developed a dedicated fan-base before its release, with many congregating in a subreddit to track and share information published about the game. Sam Zucchi writing for Kill Screen proposed that the players anxiously awaiting No Man's Sky were a kind of religion, putting faith in Hello Games to be able deliver an experience that has otherwise never been offered by video games before, the ability to explore a near-infinite universe.

Following the news of the game's delay from June to August 2016, Murray, along with Kotaku writer Jason Schreier, who first reported on the rumour of the delay, received a number of death threats in response, which Murray publicly responded to in good humor. The situation was seen by other journalists as a growing issue between the pre-release hype created by marketing for video games, and the excited nature of the fans of these games even before their release. New Statesman Phil Hartup considered that when marketing for a game drives a need for any type of news by those anxious to play the game, disappointing news such as delays could readily lead to online fans reacting in a paranoid manner against marketing expectations. Phil Owen writing for TheWrap blamed such issues on the video game marketers, as the field had become less about selling a game and more about creating a cult-like following for the game and "weaponizing fandom".

At release 
In addition to its mixed response from critics, player reaction to the release version of No Man's Sky was generally negative in response to several issues at the game's launch, buoyed by early reactions from those that had played the game before its official release. Users expressed concern with the apparent lack of features and other issues associated with the PlayStation 4 launch, while many players on the Windows version via Steam and GOG.com gave the game negative reviews due to the poor graphics capabilities or inability to launch the game. Players were also disappointed at the apparent lack of features that Hello Games and Sony had stated in earlier announcements and interviews would be included in the game; a list initially compiled by members of the No Man's Sky subreddit consisting of all such features appeared around a week after launch. By October 2016, the game had one of the worst user-based ratings on Steam, with an aggregate "mostly negative" average from more than 70,000 users. At the 2017 Game Developers Conference, Murray admitted they have far underestimated the number of players that would initially get the game; using estimates from Inside and Far Cry: Primal, both released just before No Man's Sky, the studio had expected about 10,000 concurrent players at launch, but in actuality saw over 500,000 players across both PlayStation 4 and Windows, with about half coming from the Windows side. This overwhelmed their expected server capacity and overloaded their support team with bug reports and technical help, leading to the noted problems with communications within the release window. At the same event, Hello Games announced that they had started their own support programme, known as "Hello Labs", which will help fund and support the developers of games using procedural generation, or otherwise experimental gameplay. Murray stated they anticipate funding one or two games at a time, and that one title was already part of the programme at the time of announcement.

One of the more significant features that appeared to be absent from the release version of No Man's Sky was its multiplayer capabilities. Hello Games had stated during development that No Man's Sky would include multiplayer elements, though the implementation would be far from traditional methods as one would see in a massively multiplayer online game, to the point where Murray has told players to not think of No Man's Sky as a multiplayer game. Because of the size of the game's universe, Sean Murray estimated that more than 99.9% of the planets would never be explored by players, and that the chance of meeting other players through chance encounters would be "incredibly slim". Murray had stated in a 2014 interview that No Man's Sky would include a matchmaking system that is similar to that used for Journey when such encounters do occur; each online player would have an "open lobby" that any players in their in-universe proximity would enter and leave. This approach was envisioned to provide "cool moments" for players as they encounter each other, but not meant to support gameplay like player versus environment or fully cooperative modes. According to Murray in 2018, Hello Games had worked to try to keep this light multiplayer element in the game through the final part of their development cycle, but found that it was very difficult to include, and opted to remove it for the game's release, believing that with the size of the game's universe, only a few players would end up experiencing it.

Questions regarding the multiplayer aspects of No Man's Sky were raised a day following the official release on the PlayStation 4. Two players attempted to meet at a location in the game's virtual universe after one player recognised the other upon seeing their username attached to a planetary discovery. Despite confirming they had been at the same spot on the same planet outside of the game through their respective Twitch streams, they could not see each other. Furthering this was the discovery that European copies of the limited edition packaging used a sticker to cover the PEGI online play icon. Journalists noted a number of potential reasons why the players may not have encountered each other, including the users being on separate instances or server problems reported by Hello Games at launch, though some opined that this may have been a feature removed before launch. Hello Games noted that they have had "far more" players than they expected at launch and are bringing on more people to help support the game along with patching the critical issues at the game's launch, but they have not made a direct statement on the multiplayer situation .

Outside of patch notes, Hello Games had effectively gone silent on social media right after the game's release up until the announcement of the Foundation update in late November 2016. Murray, who used the Hello Games' Twitter account with some frequency before release, had not been visible online for the first two months following the game's release. In the announcement of this update, Hello Games admitted to being "quiet" but have been paying attention to the various criticisms levelled at the game.  Schreier from Kotaku and Ben Kuchera of Polygon commented that some of the negative player reaction was due to a lack of clarification on these apparently missing features from either Hello Games or Sony in the weeks just after release, with Kuchera further stating that with the silence from either company, "the loudest, most negative voices are shouting unopposed" and leading to a strong negative perception of the game. Kuchera later wrote that many of the issues in the lead-up and follow-up to No Man's Sky release, whether by choice or happenstance, provide many lessons on the importance of proper public relations. Kuchera specifically pointed to the decision to withhold review copies and an apparent lack of public relations (PR) to manage statements relating to what features would be in the game. Kuchera also noted that many people had taken the hype generated by the press only to be disappointed by the final game, and that consumers did have ways to evaluate the game following its release before they purchased the title. Sony president Shuhei Yoshida admitted that Hello Games did not have "a great PR strategy" for No Man's Sky, in part for lacking a dedicated PR staff to manage expectations, but still support the developers as they continue to patch and update the game. Jesse Signal, writing for the Boston Globe noted that some of the hype for No Man's Sky may be attributed to game journalists themselves for getting too excited about the game, positing "Had journalists asked certain questions at certain times, perhaps it would have been more difficult for Hello Games to make promises it couldn't deliver on." Murray himself stated in a 2019 interview that prior to the game's release, much of their contact was with journalists who Hello Games believed understood the nature of video game development, and thus expected their statements about what No Man's Sky would be tempered to reflect the reality of Hello Games being a small team with limited time. Instead, Murray found that the press took their words for granted, and created expectations for players that they could not have met at launch. As a result, Hello Games has since shifted toward communication directly with the community rather than the press and keeping only to patch updates or near-release features to keep expectations in check.

The lack of features in the release version of the game became a point of contention, with many players using the Steam and GOG.com review pages, along with Metacritic reviews, to give it poor ratings. Sean Murray received a great deal of online criticism from players, including accusations of lying. A Reddit user temporarily took down the documented list of removed features after he received messages that congratulated him on "really sticking it to these 'dirtbag' devs", which was not his intention in publishing the list; he wanted no part of the anger towards Hello Games. The subreddit forum had become hostile due to a lack of updates from Hello Games or Sony, leading one moderator to shutting down the subreddit due to the toxicity of the comments, later undoing that action on further review.

In an interview in July 2018, Murray stated that the period following No Man's Sky release was difficult for him and the studio due to the backlash that included numerous death and bomb threats during that period that forced the studio to be in constant contact with Scotland Yard. Murray stated of that period, "I find it really personal, and I don't have any advice for dealing with it." The Hello Games' Twitter account had been hacked into in October 2016 and used to post the message "No Man's Sky was a mistake" among other tweets before the companies regained control of it, leading to confusion and additional drama within the community. Users sought refunds for the game via both Sony and Valve outside of the normal time allowance for claiming such refunds by their policies, citing the numerous bugs within the game and/or the lack of features, and while some players claim to have received such refunds, both companies have reemphasised their refund policies in response to the volume of refund requests.

Game journalist Geoff Keighley, who had been in discussions with Murray and Hello Games throughout the development, had expressed concern to Murray in the year leading up to release, according to Keighley in September 2016. He said he was "internally conflicted" about the state of the game near its release, recognising that many of the features that Murray had been talking about were not going to make it, and compared Murray to Peter Molyneux who had overpromised on a vision for his games that ultimately fell short. Keighley had expressed to Murray his concern that the $60 price tag was a bit steep for the current state of the game and recommended that they take an early access approach instead. According to Keighley, Murray said he didn't want to be around Keighley any more as he was "a little too negative about the game and [Keighley]'s assessment of where the team was at". Keighley felt that Murray could not "rip off that band-aid" and explain exactly what had made it and had to be cut for the game prior to release, and in the end appeared to "disrespect his audience". As such, Keighley sympathised with those that felt they were misled by the marketing. Keighley rekindled the relationship with Murray since launch, and anticipated discussing more of what happened near release with him. Sony chairman Shawn Layden, in November 2016, stated that Hello Games had an "incredible vision" and a "very huge ambition" for No Man's Sky, and that the developers are still working to update the game to bring it to what they wanted, adding that "sometimes you just don't get all the way there at the first go". Layden further expressed that from Sony's side, they recognised that they "don't want to stifle ambition" and force a specific style of play onto their games.

In September 2016, the Advertising Standards Authority (ASA) of the United Kingdom, following on "several complaints", began an investigation into the promotion of No Man's Sky. The ASA has authority to require publishers to remove offending advertising materials if they are found in violation of ASA standards. In the No Man's Sky complaints directed at Hello Games and Valve, the ASA specifically evaluated materials used on the Steam store page to promote the game that demonstrate features that do not appear to be a part of the final game, but has also reviewed other official promotional outlets including the game's official YouTube channel. Several game industry lawyers, speaking to PC Gamer, noted that while the ASA has successfully taken action in previous cases of false advertising, demonstrating such for a procedurally generated game of No Man's Sky scope may be difficult since it is impossible to play the entire game to prove something does not exist. The lawyers also noted that most of what Murray and other Hello Games members said outside of any official promotional channels, such as interviews or through social media, cannot be taken as part of the game's advertising, further limiting the claims that the ASA can act on. The ASA ruled in November 2016 that the Steam storepage advertising of No Man's Sky was not in breach of their standards, attributing the used footage and screenshots to be reasonable representative of the average player's experience with a procedurally generated game, and dismissed the submitted complaints; the ASA further ruled that as Valve has no control over what Hello Games included on the store page, they were not liable for the material either.

Subsequent updates 
On 25 November 2016, Hello Games announced it was planning on bringing a large update, known as the "Foundation" Update, to the game, stating that "We have been quiet, but we are listening and focusing on improving the game that our team loves and feels so passionately about." Hello Games had not mentioned a release window, and many journalists were surprised when the update was released just two days later. The update was generally well received by journalists, that while not fully satisfying all the features that seemed to have been promised for the game, helped to push the game into the right direction in anticipation of future major patches. The update had drawn back some players that had previously turned their back on the game and created a better reception from some players, while others still remained disappointed by the game's initial release problems. The second major update, "Path Finder", was released in March 2017. By the time of the third major update, "Atlas Rises", a year after initial release, many felt the game was now much better and approaching what they had expected. Wired Julie Muncy said that the ability of the updates to No Man's Sky demonstrates the game can be more organic, adding significant new features that can dramatically change the feel of the game.

In retrospect following the patch, journalists generally commended Hello Games for staying quiet about the exact details of the update until just prior to its release to avoid the same situation that the game fell into upon its initial release. Murray himself has avoided commenting directly on any of the updates for No Man's Sky and staying out of the "hype cycle" until they are at the shipping point, to not repeat any of the mistakes from the game's launch. Nearly all subsequent major updates were only predicated by Murray tweeting an emoji that hinted at the contents of the update two or three days before the update was released, allowing the game's community to get hyped up without drawing out their anticipation.  Gamasutra named Hello Games one of its top ten developers for 2016 not only for the technical achievements within No Man's Sky, but also for not collapsing amid the anger directed at the company and instead continuing to make improvements to the game. The continued free improvements to No Man's Sky have been considered a redemption for Hello Games and the game's launch by several outlets. By the time of its five-year anniversary, No Man's Sky user reviews on Steam had swung to "mostly positive" after initially starting at "overwhelmingly negative" at the time of its release.

Influence 
The discrepancy between No Man's Sky'''s expectations and its initially released product are considered a milestone in video game promotion, with many sources considering how to properly promote a game in a "post No Man's Sky world". The situation around the game's promotion using screenshots and videos that were not from its final state, a practice known as "bullshotting", led to discussion among developers, publishers, and journalists of how to best showcase upcoming games without being deceptive to the audience. Keighley, who felt some responsibility for the No Man's Sky situation, announced that all games that would be shown at The Game Awards 2016 would be more focused on gameplay of near-completed games using a Let's Play-type format rather than allowing for scripted or pre-rendered videos. Several journalists attribute a change in Valve's Steam storefront policies in November 2016, requiring all game screenshots and videos to be from the final product, as a response to No Man's Sky.

The failure of No Man's Sky promotional aspects has affected other space simulation and open world games that are based on the premise of providing a vast ranging sandbox for players, as players have become wary of the broad claims that these games might make. Novaquark, the developers of the upcoming open-world Dual Universe, found themselves struggling to complete their Kickstarter funding in the months immediately after No Man's Sky release, but have recognised the need to be open and transparent to potential funders on what the game will and will not have. Fenix Fire, the developers of the space exploration game Osiris: New Dawn, used the various question-and-answers that Sean Murray had to handle during the pre-release period to gauge what players were looking for in such games and guide development of their own game. According to a report from Kotaku, BioWare had envisioned that Mass Effect: Andromeda would use procedural generation for creating a universe to explore prior to No Man's Sky announcement, and further pushed for this following the excitement for No Man's Sky once it was announced, but could not get the procedural generation to work well with the Frostbite 3 game engine, and had to scrap these plans by 2015.Eurogamer Wesley Yin-Poole observed that following No Man's Sky problematic release, developers appear to be "keeping their cards close to their chests for fear of failing to deliver on a promise that never should have slipped out in the first place"; as an example, he stated that Rare's Sea of Thieves, whereas having only been promoted through obscure videos that left too many questions to potential players in its earlier stages, has started an "Insider" programme in December 2016 to provide limited alpha-testing access and more concrete gameplay videos. Similarly, Compulsion Games, who premiered their game We Happy Few at PAX East 2015 to similar hype as No Man's Sky, worked to backtrack on perceived expectations of their game after seeing what had happened to No Man's Sky'' at its launch. Specifically, Compulsion, a small developer, found that many were treating their game as a AAA release, and wanted to be clear what the game was to be, deciding to use the early access approach to provide transparency.

Notes

References

External links 
 

2016 video games
BAFTA winners (video games)
Faster-than-light travel in fiction
Golden Joystick Award winners
HTC Vive games
Indie video games
IOS games
MacOS games
Multiplayer and single-player video games
Nintendo Switch games
Oculus Rift games
Open-world video games
PlayStation 4 games
PlayStation 4 Pro enhanced games
PlayStation 5 games
PlayStation VR games
PlayStation VR2 games
Science fiction video games
Space massively multiplayer online role-playing games
Video games with Steam Workshop support
Survival video games
The Game Awards winners
Video game controversies
Video games about extraterrestrial life
Video games developed in the United Kingdom
Video games set on fictional planets
Video games using Havok
Video games using procedural generation
Video games with cross-platform play
Video games with voxel graphics
Windows games
Xbox Cloud Gaming games
Xbox One games
Xbox One X enhanced games
Xbox Series X and Series S games